Wizzywig is a 2011 American comic book series by Ed Piskor. It deals with Kevin "Boingthump" Phenicle, a young prodigy who becomes fascinated with social engineering, phone phreaking, and eventually computer hacking. As the series progresses, Kevin grows as well as his trials and tribulations with hacking. His endeavors make him legendary; his abilities are feared and also revered by many.

The main character from the series, Kevin, is a composite of many well-known phreaks and hackers such as Kevin Mitnick, Kevin Poulsen, Joybubbles, and many others. 

Volumes 1 and 2 are available through Piskor's website.

Sources

External links
Piskor's website

Wizzywig
Wizzyzig
Satirical comics
Comics set in the 2010s
Comics set in the United States
Male characters in comics
Fictional American people
American comics characters